Chorebus is a genus of parasitoid wasps in the family Braconidae. There are around 430 accepted species in the genus.

The genus was first described in 1833 by Alexander Henry Haliday.

References

External links 

 
Braconidae genera
Taxa named by Alexander Henry Haliday
Taxa described in 1833